Beautiful Distortion is the eleventh album by Dutch rock band the Gathering. It was released on 29 April 2022 via the Gathering's imprint Psychonaut Records. It is their first full-length album in over nine years, after the band took an hiatus in 2014. It is also the first studio album to feature the band's founding bassist Hugo Prinsen Geerligs since their 2003 effort Souvenirs. He replaced Marjolein Kooijman, who had previously replaced him.

Background 
The band had first announced that they were recording an album in February 2021, when they had shared pictures from inside the studio.

Attie Bauw, the producer of this album, had also previously produced the Gathering's albums How to Measure a Planet? and Home.

The album's first single, "In Colour", was released on 13 October 2021. This was followed by their second single "We Rise", released via a music video on 9 February 2022. At 4:33, the music video is shorter than the "single edit" version of the song posted on their Bandcamp page.

On the same day of Beautiful Distortions release, an EP titled Interference, is also being released, which is meant as a companion piece to the album. A music video for the EP's song "Stronger" was released in December 2021.

Following the release, the Gathering will perform concerts for AutoReverse: 30th Anniversary Tour, which includes four dates in the Netherlands, three in Mexico, and one each in Colombia, Bolivia, Chile and Brazil.

Track listing

Personnel 

The Gathering
Silje Wergeland – vocals
Frank Boeijen – keyboards and piano
Hugo Prinsen Geerligs – bass, guitar, keyboards, piano, percussion
René Rutten – guitars, keyboards, percussion
Hans Rutten – drums, percussion

Production
Attie Bauw – production
Studio Captain – artwork
Maor Applebaum – mastering

Notes

References 

2022 albums
The Gathering (band) albums